In mathematics, the Selberg class is an axiomatic definition of a class of L-functions. The members of the class are Dirichlet series which obey four axioms that seem to capture the essential properties satisfied by most functions that are commonly called L-functions or zeta functions. Although the exact nature of the class is conjectural, the hope is that the definition of the class will lead to a classification of its contents and an elucidation of its properties, including insight into their relationship to automorphic forms and the Riemann hypothesis.

Definition
The formal definition of the class S is the set of all Dirichlet series

absolutely convergent for Re(s) > 1 that satisfy four axioms (or assumptions as Selberg calls them):

Comments on definition
The condition that the real part of μi be non-negative is because there are known L-functions that do not satisfy the Riemann hypothesis when μi is negative. Specifically, there are Maass forms associated with exceptional eigenvalues, for which the Ramanujan–Peterssen conjecture holds, and have a functional equation, but do not satisfy the Riemann hypothesis.

The condition that θ < 1/2 is important, as the θ = 1 case includes  whose zeros are not on the critical line.

Without the condition  there would be  which violates the Riemann hypothesis.

It is a consequence of 4. that the an are multiplicative and that

Examples
The prototypical example of an element in S is the Riemann zeta function. Another example, is the L-function of the modular discriminant Δ 

where  and τ(n) is the Ramanujan tau function.

All known examples are automorphic L-functions, and the reciprocals of Fp(s) are polynomials in p−s of bounded degree.

The best results on the structure of the Selberg class are due to Kaczorowski and Perelli, who show that the Dirichlet L-functions (including the Riemann zeta-function) are the only examples with degree less than 2.

Basic properties
As with the Riemann zeta function, an element F of S has trivial zeroes that arise from the poles of the gamma factor γ(s). The other zeroes are referred to as the non-trivial zeroes of F. These will all be located in some strip .

Here, dF is called the degree (or dimension) of F. It is given by

It can be shown that F = 1 is the only function in S whose degree is less than 1.

If F and G are in the Selberg class, then so is their product and

A function  in S is called primitive if whenever it is written as F = F1F2, with Fi in S, then F = F1 or F = F2. If dF = 1, then F is primitive. Every function  of S can be written as a product of primitive functions. Selberg's conjectures, described below, imply that the factorization into primitive functions is unique.

Examples of primitive functions include the Riemann zeta function and Dirichlet L-functions of primitive Dirichlet characters. Assuming conjectures 1 and 2 below, L-functions of irreducible cuspidal automorphic representations that satisfy the Ramanujan conjecture are primitive.

Selberg's conjectures

In , Selberg made conjectures concerning the functions in S:
Conjecture 1: For all F in S, there is an integer nF such that   and nF = 1 whenever F is primitive.
Conjecture 2: For distinct primitive F, F′ ∈ S, 
Conjecture 3: If F is in S with primitive factorization  χ is a primitive Dirichlet character, and the function  is also in S, then the functions Fiχ are primitive elements of S (and consequently, they form the primitive factorization of Fχ).
Riemann hypothesis for S: For all F in S, the non-trivial zeroes of F all lie on the line Re(s) = 1/2.

Consequences of the conjectures

Conjectures 1 and 2 imply that if F has a pole of order m at s = 1, then F(s)/ζ(s)m is entire. In particular, they imply Dedekind's conjecture.

M. Ram Murty showed in  that conjectures 1 and 2 imply the Artin conjecture. In fact, Murty showed that Artin L-functions corresponding to irreducible representations of the Galois group of a solvable extension of the rationals are automorphic as predicted by the Langlands conjectures.

The functions in S also satisfy an analogue of the prime number theorem: F(s) has no zeroes on the line Re(s) = 1. As mentioned above, conjectures 1 and 2 imply the unique factorization of functions in S into primitive functions. Another consequence is that the primitivity of F is equivalent to nF = 1.

See also
 List of zeta functions

Notes

References
  Reprinted in Collected Papers, vol 2, Springer-Verlag, Berlin (1991)

Zeta and L-functions